Parcast is a digital media firm and podcast network, that specializes in producing both scripted podcasts as well as audio dramas. It was founded in 2016 by podcaster Max Cutler and his father Ron Cutler in Los Angeles California.

In 2019, it was acquired by Sweden-based media firm and streaming service provider Spotify. Spotify  spent over $56 million to acquire Parcast, however the total compensation has been reported to be over $100 million. This makes the Parcast acquisition one of the largest podcasting platform mergers in US history and largest single acquisition deal of Spotify's $400 million acquisition program.

History 
Cutler, a 27-year old graduate of the University of Arizona, launched Parcast in 2016. He was inspired by the hit podcast Serial, itself a spinoff of This American Life. He believed that his network could produce podcasts of comparable quality while saving money on the production of individual episodes.

Parcast's original focus was on producing scripted true crime series, but their scope expanded into the mystery, science fiction, and history genres as well as fictional audiodramas.

Parcast currently produces over 40 daily and weekly shows, supported by a team of more than 75 voice actors, producers, and scriptwriters. Unlike competitors such as Wondery or Gimlet Media, Parcast focuses on producing a higher quantity of podcasts.

Audience 

According to due diligence performed by Spotify, over 75% of Parcast's audience is female.

Series produced

See also
List of podcasting companies

Citations used

External links 
 Parcast website

2019 mergers and acquisitions
Podcasting companies
American companies established in 2016
Mass media companies established in 2016
2016 podcast debuts
2016 establishments in California
Spotify
Companies based in Los Angeles
American subsidiaries of foreign companies